Anna Wałek-Czernecka (1890-1978) was a Polish botanist and professor at the University of Łódź noted for her studies of the genera Populus, Larix, and Thuja.

References 

1890 births
1978 deaths
20th-century Polish women scientists
20th-century Polish botanists